Guoqiang is the Mandarin Pinyin spelling of a Chinese male given name meaning "strong country". The same name is also spelled Kuo-chiang in Mandarin Wade-Giles (used in Taiwan) and Kwok-keung in Cantonese pronunciation.

People with this name include:
Cai Guo-Qiang (born 1957), Chinese artist
 Chan Kwok-keung (born 1946), Hong Kong politician
He Guoqiang (born 1943), Chinese politician
Sham Kwok Keung (born 1985), Hong Kong international footballer
Sun Guoqiang (born 1974), Chinese baseball player
Tang Guoqiang (born 1952), Chinese actor
Yang Guoqiang (born 1954), Chinese entrepreneur, founder of Country Garden Group
Rimsky Yuen Kwok-keung (born 1964), Hong Kong lawyer
Zeng Guoqiang (born 1965), Chinese weightlifter
Zhang Guoqiang (born 1969), Chinese actor

See also
Chinese given name

Chinese masculine given names